

Events 
 January–March 
 January 23 – (January 12 Old Style) The Conventicle Act (Konventikelplakatet) is adopted in Sweden, outlawing all non-Lutheran religious meetings outside of church services.
 January 26 – The First Treaty of Vienna is signed between Austria, the Holy Roman Empire and Spain, creating the Austro-Spanish Alliance in advance of a war against Great Britain.
 January 27 – On its maiden voyage, the Dutch East India Company frigate Aagtekerke departs from the Dutch Cape Colony on the second leg of its journey to the Dutch East Indies and is never seen again.  Aagtekerke had carried with it a crew of 200 men and was lost somewhere in the Indian Ocean.
 February 8 – The Supreme Privy Council is established in Russia.
 February 13 – The Parliament of Negrete (between Mapuche and Spanish authorities in Chile) brings an end to the Mapuche uprising of 1723–26. 
 March 10 – China's Emperor Yongzheng issues a special edict instructing his "Vice Minister of Punishments" Huang Bing to interrogate Qin Daoran, who provides the evidence that Yongzheng's brothers Yintang, Yin-ssu and Yin-ti, had conspired to overthrow the Emperor.
 March 29 – The first large shipment of slaves arrives in New Orleans as the slave ship L'Aurore arrives with 290 black people captured in Gambia. During the 90-day voyage from Gorée in Senegal, 60 of the slaves had died.
 March 30 – After King Haffon of the West African Kingdom of Whydah (now in Benin) allows Portuguese traders to build Fort São João Batista in the capital at Savi, mercenaries of the Dutch West India Company make a failed attempt to destroy the fort by "throwing two flaming spears over the walls". By 1726, traders from Britain, France, the Netherlands and Portugal are all competing to establish trade with Whydah, which supplies other West Africans to be used as slaves.
 March 31 – France's first ambassador to Russia, Jacques de Campredon, leaves after four years of trying to negotiate a Franco-Russian alliance with Catherine I and a failed attempt to arrange a marriage between King Louis XV and Catherine's daughter Elizabeth.

 April–June 
 May 1 – Voltaire begins his exile in England.
 June 11 – Louis Henri, Duke of Bourbon, is dismissed from being the Prime Minister of France and Jean Pâris de Monmartel is removed from his position as Guard of the Royal Treasury by King Louis XV.  The King selects his former tutor, André-Hercule de Fleury to replace the Duke of Bourbon as his Chief Minister.  Fleury and the Duke of Bourbon had clashed with each other in their services as adviser to the King, and Fleury's departure from the court in protest and led to his recall and the firing of the Duke.

 July–September 
 July 11 – André-Hercule Cardinal de Fleury, recalled from exile by King Louis XV of France, banishes Louis Henri, Duke of Bourbon, and Madame de Prie from court.
 August 7 – Pirate Nicholas Brown is captured near Xtabi, Jamaica.
 September 6 – An explosion kills all but seven of the 700 passengers and crew on the Portuguese Navy galleon HMFMS Santa Rosa as its cargo of gunpowder blows up.  Historians speculate that of the 693 people on the ship, those who weren't killed by the explosion drowned or were killed by sharks as the ship went down off of the coast of Recife.
 September 16 – An earthquake strikes Sicily and kills 226 people in Palermo. 
 September 11 – French bishop André-Hercule de Fleury, later Prime Minister for King Louis XV of France, is made a Roman Catholic Cardinal by Pope Benedict XIII.
 September 23 – Charles VI, Holy Roman Emperor, issues an order limiting the number of Jews who can be legally recognized as legitimate householders.
 September 14 – The Nanfan Treaty of July 19, 1701 between the Iroquois Confederacy  and the British Province of New York, is amended by both parties.
 September 24 – Permission to celebrate the feast of Our Lady of Mount Carmel, celebrated on July 17, is extended by Pope Benedict XIII to the entire Roman Catholic Church.

 October–December 
 November 8 – (October 28 Old Style) Jonathan Swift's satirical novel Gulliver's Travels is first published (anonymously) in London; it sells out within a week.
 November 20 – Callinicus, Metropolitan of Heraclea dies suddenly only one day after being elected the Ecumenical Patriarch of Constantinople, the highest office in the Eastern Orthodox Church.  Callinicus is said to have paid a record fee to the Ottoman Sultan to guarantee his appointment.
 November – Mary Toft allegedly gives birth to 16 rabbits in England; the story is later revealed to be a hoax.
 December 24 – The settlement of Montevideo is founded by the Spaniards in the Viceroyalty of Peru.

 Date unknown 
 The Gujin Tushu Jicheng, an immense Chinese encyclopedia, is printed using copper-based movable type printing.
 Muhammad bin Saud becomes head of the House of Saud.
 The remaining ruins of Liverpool Castle in England are finally demolished.
 In late 1726, Nader recaptured Mashhad.

Births 
 January 14 – Jacques-Donatien Le Ray, French supporter of the American Revolution (d. 1803)
 January 17 – Hugh Mercer, brigadier general in the American Continental Army, and a close friend to George Washington (d. 1777)
 February 4 – Jean-Jacques Blaise d'Abbadie, Director-general of the Colony of Louisiana (d. 1765)
 February 7 – Margaret Fownes-Luttrell, British painter (d. 1766)
 March 8 – Richard Howe, British admiral (d. 1799)
 April 5 – Benjamin Harrison V, signer of the American Declaration of Independence (d. 1791)
 April 8 – Lewis Morris, American landowner and developer, signer of the United States Declaration of Independence (d. 1798)
 April 12 – Charles Burney, English music historian (d. 1814)
 April 20 – Joseph de Ferraris, Austrian cartographer of the Austrian Netherlands (d. 1814)

 June 3 O.S. – James Hutton, Scottish geologist (d. 1797)
 June 14 O.S. – Thomas Pennant, Welsh naturalist (d. 1798)
 June 20 – Louise Henriette of Bourbon, Duchess of Orléans, mother of Philippe Égalité (d. 1759)
 July 1 – Acharya Bhikshu, Jain saint (d. 1803)
 July 30 – William Jones (1726–1800), British clergyman, author (d. 1800)
 August 7 – James Bowdoin, American Revolutionary leader, politician (d. 1790)
 August 9 – Francesco Cetti, Italian Jesuit scientist (d. 1778)
 September 1 – François-André Danican Philidor, French composer, chess player (d. 1795)
 September 2 – John Howard (prison reformer), English philanthropist (d. 1790) 
 September 26 – John H. D. Anderson, Scottish scientist (d. 1796)
 September 26   – Angelo Maria Bandini, Italian librarian (d. 1803) 
 October 16 – Daniel Chodowiecki, Polish painter (d. 1801)
 December 4 – Lord Stirling, American brigadier-general during the American Revolutionary War (d. 1783)
 date unknown
 Lê Quý Đôn, Vietnamese philosopher, poet, encyclopedist, and government official (d. 1784)
 Cyprian Howe, American colonel in the American Revolutionary War (d. 1806)
 Katsukawa Shunshō, Japanese woodblock artist (d. 1792)
 Jedediah Strutt, English businessman (d. 1797)
 Lady Anne Monson, English botanist (d. 1776)

Deaths 
 January 2 – Domenico Zipoli, Tuscan-born composer and Jesuit missionary (b. 1688)
 January 12 – Hercule-Louis Turinetti, marquis of Prié (b. 1658)
 January 19 
 Franz Beer, Austrian architect (b. 1659)
 Giovanni Battista Tolomei, Italian Jesuit priest, theologian and cardinal (b. 1653)
 January 25 – Guillaume Delisle, French cartographer (b. 1675)
 February 18 – Jacques Carrey, French painter (b. 1649)
 February 26 – Maximilian II Emanuel, Elector of Bavaria (b. 1662)
 March 5 – Evelyn Pierrepont, 1st Duke of Kingston-upon-Hull, English politician
 March 6 – Henrietta Catharina, Baroness von Gersdorff, German noblewoman; poet (b. 1648)
 March 13 – Alexander Pendarves, British politician (b. 1662)

 March 14 – Chhatrapati Shivaji Raje Bhonsale 2nd, 5th Maratha Emperor (b. 1696) 
 March 26 – John Vanbrugh, English architect and dramatist (b. 1664)
 April 26 – Jeremy Collier, English theatre critic, non-juror bishop and theologian (b. 1650)
 April 28 – Thomas Pitt, British Governor of Madras (b. 1653)
 May 10 – Charles Beauclerk, 1st Duke of St Albans, English soldier (b. 1670)
 June 18 – Michel Richard Delalande, French organist, composer (b. 1657)
 July 3 – Galeazzo Marescotti, Italian Catholic cardinal (b. 1627)
 July 8 – John Ker, Scottish spy (b. 1673)
 July 22 – Hugh Drysdale, British Colonial Governor of Virginia
 July 31 – Nicolaus II Bernoulli, Swiss mathematician (b. 1695)
 September 22 – Aixinjueluo Yuntang, born Aixinjueluo Yintang, Qing prince (b. 1683)
 October 29 – Jean Boivin the Younger, French writer (b. 1663)
 November 22 – Anton Domenico Gabbiani, Italian painter (b. 1652)
 November 23 – Sophia Dorothea of Celle, queen consort of George I of Great Britain (b. 1666)
 December 2 – Samuel Penhallow, American colonist, historian (b. 1665)

References